Nikica Ljubek (born 19 October 1980 in Osijek) is a Croatian sprint canoer and marathon canoeist who competed in the early 2000s. He was eliminated in the semifinals of both the C-1 1000 m and the C-2 500 m events at the 2000 Summer Olympics in Sydney. He was second on Canoe marathon championship 2008 in Czech republic in c-1 26 km. In 2010 he was on 4th place on World canoe championship in Banyoles-Spain in c-1 26 km

Nikica Ljubek is the son of Matija Ljubek, Olympic and World champion canoer.

References

External links

 Sports-Reference.com profile
 Nikica Ljubek prvi u spomen-utrci na njegova oca 

1980 births
Canoeists at the 2000 Summer Olympics
Croatian male canoeists
Living people
Olympic canoeists of Croatia
Sportspeople from Osijek